Edward Cameron Duggins (August 23, 1912 – October 16, 1960) was an American college football coach.  He was the ninth head football coach at Appalachian State Teachers College—now known as Appalachian State University—located in Boone, North Carolina, serving from 1947 to 1950 and again from 1952 to 1955. The Mountaineers compiled a record of 57–25–3, captured three North State Conference titles, and played in seven small college bowl games under Duggins.

Head coaching record

See also
 List of college football head coaches with non-consecutive tenure

References

External links
 

1912 births
1960 deaths
Appalachian State Mountaineers football coaches
Tampa Spartans football coaches
Milligan University alumni
People from Clinton, Tennessee